The Minister of Consumer and Corporate Affairs was a cabinet position in the government of Manitoba, Canada.

The position initially emerged from the offices of Provincial Secretary and Minister of Public Works in the late 1960s. John Carroll and Rene Toupin, who held both of the aforementioned positions in different ministries, were also recognized as Ministers of Consumer and Corporate Affairs.

As with many other government departments in Manitoba, its specific ministerial designation was changed several times. Ben Hanuschak was appointed to succeed Toupin in 1970, and was given the title of Minister of Consumer and Corporate Affairs and Internal Services. This title was retained until 1978, when the new minister Warner Jorgenson was designated as the Minister of Consumer and Corporate Affairs. On November 15, 1979, the department was restructured again as the Ministry of Consumer and Corporate Affairs and Environment. Responsibility for the Environment was transferred to a different minister in 1981, and the Consumer and Corporate Affairs title was resumed.

From 1989 to 1993, the portfolio was referred to as the Ministry of Co-operative, Consumer and Corporate Affairs. The simplified title was again resumed when Jim Ernst was appointed as minister.

The department was eliminated in 2002, and its responsibilities folded into the office of Finance Minister Greg Selinger. Manitoba was one of the last provinces in Canada to have a separate Consumer and Corporate Affairs ministry.

List of Ministers of Consumer and Corporate Affairs

References

Consumer and Corporate Affairs, Minister of